In the 2011–12 season, KK Crvena zvezda will compete in the Basketball League of Serbia, Kup Radivoja Koraća and Adriatic League.

Players

Current roster

Depth chart

Roster changes

In
  Filip Čović (from FMP Železnik)
  Nikola Marković (from FMP Železnik)
  Mile Ilić (from FMP Železnik)
  Branko Lazić (from FMP Železnik)
  Bojan Subotić (from FMP Železnik)
  Bojan Radetić (from FMP Železnik)
  Andreja Milutinović (from FMP Železnik)
  Vuk Radivojević (from FMP Železnik)
  Petar Popović (from  Spartak Saint Petersburg)
  Adam Morrison (was free agent during 2010–11 season)
  Bojan Popović (from  Lucentum Alicante)
  Nikola Vasić (was free agent during 2010–11 season)
  Omar Thomas (from  Sidigas Avellino)

Out
  Ricardo Marsh (to  Hacettepe)
  Strahinja Milošević (to  KK Vojvodina)
  Lazar Radosavljević (to  Mornar)
  Luka Drča (to OKK Beograd)
  Darko Balaban (to Smederevo 1953)
  Ivan Marinković (to Partizan)
  Boris Bakić (to Radnički Kragujevac)
  Adam Morrison (to  Beşiktaş)

Statistics

Adriatic League

Updated: 18 March 2012
1 Stats with Crvena zvezda (partial season).

Basketball League of Serbia

Updated: 15 June 2012

Awards
Liga ABA Weekly MVP

Basketball League of Serbia Weekly MVP

 Basketball League of Serbia Finals MVP –  Omar Thomas
 Basketball League of Serbia Finals Best Scorer –  Omar Thomas
 Radivoj Korać Cup Best Scorer –  Mile Ilić

Competitions

Adriatic League

Standings

Pld - Played; W - Won; L - Lost; PF - Points for; PA - Points against; Diff - Difference; Pts - Points.

Matches

Basketball League of Serbia

Standings

P=Matches played, W=Matches won, L=Matches lost, F=Points for, A=Points against, D=Points difference, Pts=Points

Matches

Semifinals
Game 1

Game 2

Game 3

Final
Game 1

Game 2

Game 3

Game 4

Kup Radivoja Koraća
Quarterfinals

Semifinals

Final

References

External links
 Official website 
 KK Crvena zvezda at adriaticbasket.com

KK Crvena Zvezda seasons
Crvena